The River Dever  is a chalk stream in Hampshire in the south of England.

Course
The source is at  Above Ordnance Datum (AOD) alongside the A33, the main road north-east from Winchester, of Roman origin, and meanders west through the village of Micheldever, three hamlets: Weston Colley, Stoke Charity and Wonston, then its largest village, Sutton Scotney, followed by Upper and Lower Bullington. The river skirts to the north of Barton Stacey and through the hamlet of Bransbury, meeting the Test on Bransbury Common, opposite the east fields of Wherwell on the multi-channel Test's West Bank at  AOD.

Etymology
From Old English times some records have Myceldefer.

Alternatively the Old Welsh  for "bog" is suggested by the earliest-known form, from 862, Mycendefr, not relatively prevalent due to the gradient and alkaline water.

Attributes
It is essentially fed by very close chalk aquifers, likewise to its continuation the Test, a highly abundant watercourse in Europe for large trout. It includes two trout farms, at the otherwise almost wholly green locality of Bransbury, and at Difford, north of Barton Stacey. The watermill at Weston Colley is a Grade II listed building/. The mill at Bransbury is also Grade II listed.

Water quality
The Environment Agency measures the water quality of the river systems in England. Each is given an overall ecological status, which may be one of five levels: high, good, moderate, poor and bad. There are several components that are used to determine this, including biological status, which looks at the quantity and varieties of invertebrates, angiosperms and fish. Chemical status, which compares the concentrations of various chemicals against known safe concentrations, is rated good or fail.

Water quality of the River Dever in 2019:

References
References

Notes

External links

River Dever Valley Floor

Dever, River
1Dever